The 2019–20 Butler Bulldogs men's basketball team represented Butler University in the 2019–20 NCAA Division I men's basketball season. They were coached by LaVall Jordan, in his third year as head coach of his alma mater. The Bulldogs played their home games at Hinkle Fieldhouse in Indianapolis, Indiana as members of the Big East Conference. The Bulldogs finished the season 23–9, 10–8 in Big East play which put them in fifth place. As the No. 5 seed in the Big East tournament, they were slated to play Providence in the second game of the quarterfinals, but the Tournament was cancelled at halftime of the first game due to the COVID-19 pandemic, along with the rest of the NCAA postseason.

Previous season 
The Bulldogs finished the 2018–19 season 16–17, 7–11 in Big East play which tied them for eighth place. As the No. 9 seed in the Big East tournament, they were defeated by Providence in the quarterfinals. The Bulldogs received an at-large bid to the NIT as the No. 5 seed in the TCU bracket. There they were defeated in the first round by Nebraska.

Offseason

Departures

Incoming Transfers

2019 Recruiting Class

Roster

Schedule and results
 
|-
!colspan=12 style=|Exhibition

|-
!colspan=12 style=| Non-conference regular season

|-
!colspan=9 style=|Big East regular season
|-

|-
!colspan=9 style="|Big East tournament

Rankings

*AP does not release post-NCAA tournament rankings^Coaches did not release a Week 1 poll.

Awards

See also
2019–20 Butler Bulldogs women's basketball team

References

Butler
Butler Bulldogs men's basketball seasons
Butler
Butler